The Shawnee Indians were an Oklahoma State League baseball team based in Shawnee, Oklahoma, United States that played from 1923 to 1924. Major league baseball pitcher Walt Tauscher played for them. In 1923, they were managed by Clyde Wren, and in 1924 they were managed by Larry McLean.

References

Defunct minor league baseball teams
Professional baseball teams in Oklahoma
Baseball teams established in 1923
Baseball teams disestablished in 1924
1923 establishments in Oklahoma
1924 disestablishments in Oklahoma
Defunct baseball teams in Oklahoma